A fuath (lit. ‘hatred';  fuathan;  vough, vaugh) is a class of malevolent spirits in Scottish Highland folklore, especially water spirits.

In Sutherland was the so-called Moulin na Vaugha/Fouadh, ‘Mill of the Fuath', haunted by the fuath and her son, the amorphous brollachan. The mill was along a stream off Loch Migdale, and belonged to the Dempster family (Skibo Castle) estate.

A fuath once seen at this mill was a nose-less banshee with yellow hair wearing a green silk dress; in the story of its capture it was tormented into submission by use of steel (awl, and more effectively by a sewing needle), but it turned to a jellyfish-like mass when light was shone on it. A fuath on the estate farm, encountered on a different occasion, had webbed feet.

They sometimes reputedly intermarry with human beings (typically the female), whose offspring have developed a mane and tail.

Nomenclature 

The term "fuath" has been explained to be a generic class of spirits inhabiting the sea, rivers, fresh water, or sea lochs, with several "subspecies" falling under it.

The Scottish Gaelic term fuath has been explained to mean 'hatred' or 'aversion', derived from Old Irish fúath 'hate, likeness'. The term is also glossed to mean 'ghost' or 'spectre'.

An alternative name for this class of monsters is the arrachd or fuath-arrachd.

Generalization

Aquatic nature 
J. F. Campbell characterized the fuath of Sutherland as a water spirit, but it has been stressed by John Gregorson Campbell that the term designates a spectre or goblin more generally, not necessarily of aqueous nature or habitat.

Conflated description 
J. F. Campbell also conflated the traits of the fuath from different accounts in a generalized description of the fuath of Sutherland and this has also fallen under criticism by the other Campbell.

Furthermore, J. F. Campbell ascribed the mane and tail to the fuath, though these traits had evidently developed in the human progeny of the Munroe family, to which there was attached a floating rumour that their ancestor had interbred with a fuath several generations back.

While it has been generalized that the fuath of the locality wears green, "golden and silken gear" was worn by the weird woman seen plunging into the River Shin was seen by a (games)keeper of the Charlotte Dempster's family.

Tales 

The story of "The Brollachan" (and several of its variant tales) from Sutherland were collected by Charlotte Dempster in 1859, and supplied to J. F. Campbell who printed it. The stories are set in locales within the Dempster family estate (otherwise known as Skibo) The writer Charlotte was a relative of the Dempsters of the estate (being the granddaughter of Harriet, the illegitimate daughter of the captain).

 (1) J. F. Campbell ed. (1860) "The Brollachan" (Popular Tales II, Tale #37); Charlotte Dempster ed. (1888年) "The Brolachan MacVaugh" 
Two redactions collected from the same storyteller. The  brollachan is the son of a fuath, as the latter title indicates. The brollachan possesses eyes and mouth, but a shapeless mass of a body, and capable of speaking only two words/phrases, "Myself" and "Yourself" (mi-phrein and tu-phrein).
The brollachan was lying at the mill when the "Allay na Moulin" Murray, the resident alms-receiving crippled man around the mill came and stoked the fire with peat, causing burns on him. But due to the limits of his vocabulary, the blob could not properly speak the name of the perpetrator.

 (2) J. F. Campbell ed. (1860) "Moulion na Fuadh" ; Dempster ed. (1888) "The Vaugh of Moulinna Vuagha" 
A man who lives in Inveran wagers he can go and capture the "kelpie" of the mill (also called the vough, vaugh) and return. He succeeds thanks to a black-muzzled dog, and binds the kelpie to a second horse. When fording the burn at the far end (south) of Loch Migdale the vough grows agitated, and the man pokes it with an awl and a sewing needle into submission. The creature declares  the needle is worse. Upon arrival, when the others shine a light at it, it falls down, a shapeless jelly-like clump, which is much like the so-called "dropped stars" of the moors, strange objects like beached jellyfish.

 (3) J. F. Campbell ed. (1860), untitled variant; Dempster ed. (1888) "The Banshee, or Vaugh, or Weird Woman of the Water"  
At the mill haunted by the brollachan, a banshee was spotted who had yellow hair like ripened wheat, wearing a fine silk green dress, but she had no nose.

 (4) J. F. Campbell ed. (1860), untitled variant; Dempster ed. (1888) "The Web-footed Kelpie" 
The (family's) shepherd found a dirty and lamed banshee and piggybacked her, until he noticed her webbed feet, throwing her off and flinging away the plaid she lay on.

Fuath tribe members 
Below are the supposed "subspecies" of the fuath class, according to certain commentators.

 peallaidh
 fideal
 beithir, in modern oral tradition）
 ùruisg, or at least many of them
 shellycoat
 nuckelavee

Similar beings 
Similarity or equivalence to the bean nighe or Northern Ireland's uisges have been noted.

In popular culture

In ''Iron Kissed'' by Patricia Briggs, Mercy encounters The Fideal which is a fuath from Scottish folklore. In the book, it is an evil fresh water creature which is extremely large and covered in seaweed-like plants. It feasts of human flesh. “It used to live in a bog and eat straying children.“ This phrase is said by Samuel to Mercy afterwards.

Explanatory notes

References
Citations

Bibliography

 
  (U.S. edition)
 
 , Vol. 1, [https://books.google.com/books?id=5i6B2V-6dZcC　Vol. 2)
 
 
 ; text @ Internet Archive

External links
Description of the Brollachan

Aos Sí
Fairies
Fantasy creatures
Irish folklore
Irish legendary creatures
Scottish mythology
Scottish legendary creatures
Tuatha Dé Danann
Water spirits
Banshees